In Greek mythology, Chione or Khionê (Ancient Greek: Χιονη from χιών – chiōn, "snow") was the daughter of the Oceanid Callirrhoe and Nilus. She was raped by a local peasant and transformed into a snow cloud by Hermes at the order of Zeus. From the clouds she cast snow (khiôn) upon the desert. The Greek word for snow (χιών chiōn) was thought to have come from her name.

Notes

References 

 Maurus Servius Honoratus, In Vergilii carmina comentarii. Servii Grammatici qui feruntur in Vergilii carmina commentarii; recensuerunt Georgius Thilo et Hermannus Hagen. Georgius Thilo. Leipzig. B. G. Teubner. 1881. Online version at the Perseus Digital Library.

Metamorphoses into bodies of water in Greek mythology
Naiads
Children of Nilus
Mythological rape victims
Deeds of Zeus
Deeds of Hermes